Zundui Naran (born 13 February 1967) is a Mongolian former cyclist. He competed in the team time trial at the 1992 Summer Olympics. Naran was born to a Mongolian father and a Lithuanian mother. In 2010 he co-founded the Snow Leopard Club, an organisation for Mongolian cyclo-cross and off-road cyclists. As of 2018, he was the president of the Mongolian Cycling Association. He also runs the bicycle store Attila in Ulaanbaatar.

References

External links
 

1967 births
Living people
Mongolian male cyclists
Olympic cyclists of Mongolia
Cyclists at the 1992 Summer Olympics
Place of birth missing (living people)
20th-century Mongolian people